The Claustre Affair was a hostage crisis during the First Chadian Civil War. Chadian rebels, calling themselves the Command Council of the Armed Forces of the North (CCFAN), led by Nakaza nationalist Hissène Habré kidnapped Françoise Claustre, a French archaeologist, Marc Combe, a worker in a French development organization in Chad, and Christoph Staewen, a German doctor. Although Combe escaped and Staewen was ransomed back by the West German government, the rebels demanded a ransom of 10 million francs for Mrs. Claustre and her husband Pierre, who was later also captured by the rebels. The case garnered international attention, with the French sending a negotiator who was later executed. Finally the French appealed to Muammar Gaddafi to free the hostages, which he then did. The affair showcased Libya's growing influence in Central Africa.

Background 

Chad gained its independence from France in 1960, but the majority of French-educated Chadians came from the south of the country, so people from southern Chad had more power in the new government than the northerners. Although the French continued to hold on to the Borkou-Ennedi-Tibesti Prefecture, the northern part of Chad, until 1965, the lack of power for northern Chad escalated tensions between the two parts of the country. In 1966, a rebel group was formed, the Front for National Liberation of Chad, or FROLINAT, that began an insurgency in northern Chad against the post-independence government of François Tombalbaye. By 1967, the rebellion had spread to much of the country, particularly northern and eastern Chad.

Like most of France's former colonies, Chad had signed a secret agreement with France allowing for French assistance in 'domestic maintenance of order,' which stated that Chad could request France to take direct military action against an internal rebellion. However, this also meant that the French gained command of all Chadian military forces for the duration of the suppression.
By late 1969, the government had lost several important battles against FROLINAT, and appealed to French president Charles de Gaulle to crush the insurgents. DeGaulle approved the move to help the Chadian government, if they allowed France to set up a Mission de réforme administrative (MRA), headed by Pierre Claustre, to reform the Chadian government to stop a future uprising. Tombalbaye acceded to the request, and de Gaulle deployed 2800 troops and around 600 'advisors' to Chad.

The French-led coalition managed to destroy most FROLINAT groups in an operation that took around 10,000 lives, but many rebel groups managed to survive, especially in the Borkou-Ennedi-Tibesti Region. In addition, the M.R.A. didn't complete its mission to change the government of Chad, essentially setting Chad up for another rebellion for the same reason as the original.

Kidnapping 

On the night of April 12, 1974, the CCFAN led by Hissène Habré attacked the northern Chadian town of Bardaï. Auxiliary troops, gardes nomades, helped the group kidnap Marc Combe, an M.R.A. worker, Françoise Claustre, a French archaeologist, as well as Christoph Staewen, a German doctor providing medical treatment for locals. Staewen's wife was killed in the crossfire. The rebels loaded 3 cars they found on the site with food and other supplies, including Combe's radio, put the hostages in, and drove off. The Chadian garrison attempted to respond but was unable to pursue the rebels in the darkness of the desert.

Over the next few weeks, Pierre was the only person who contacted the kidnappers often, as the French ambassador Fernand Wibaux had just left, and his replacement, Raphaël Touze, would not arrive until April 27. In addition, the French president, Georges Pompidou, had just died, and there would be no centralizing policy anchor until after the general election on May 19.

Negotiations 
Tombalbaye ordered reinforcements to Bardaï, but both Pierre Claustre and the Chadian prefect in Faya-Largeau thought that the rebels would execute the hostages in response to a military buildup. Luc Baldit, the French chargé d'affaires in N'Djamena, was ordered to not provide support to a Chadian military operation that could endanger the lives of the hostages in any way.

Already, two West German envoys had arrived in Chad to negotiate with the hostages. The French were sending Robert Puissant, a high-ranking official, to be their negotiator, but it would take time for him to arrive. Franz Wallner, one of the German envoys, joined Pierre Claustre in Bardaï. On the morning of 10 May, Habré and hisCCFAN published their demands:
 The release of 32 political prisoners in N'Djamena
 The publication of a CCFAN political manifesto
 An 'indemnity' for the property of the local populations, especially the villages, palm groves, crops, and other goods that Habré claimed French and Chadian forces had destroyed during the civil war
The demands were difficult for the French to accept, and put them in a tight spot. The new French ambassador to Chad, Raphäel Touze, feared that the demands were specific enough to France's problems in the region that West Germany would go it alone and negotiate only for Staewen. In addition, by demanding that France release prisoners held by another government, Habré was straining the relationship between the French and Chadian governments. Since releasing the prisoners was not something Tombalbaye wanted to do, French policymakers wanted to go about negotiations in a way that would not undermine the authority of the Chadian government. Some Chadian officials, including the prefect of the BET Prefecture, wanted to stop any direct contact between the CCFAN and the French and German negotiators.

Franz Wallner, the German negotiator, met his French counterpart Robert Puissant and the French ambassador Touze in N'Djamena. They agreed to coordinate a negotiation strategy, but told the French that they would negotiate separately while the CCFAN maintained its demands for a prisoner release, as the West German government had no involvement in that aspect. The Germans had offered to broadcast a CCFAN manifesto over Deutsche Welle in French and Arabic for 3 days, and to pay an indemnity of 50 million CFA francs for the damages Habré stated. It seemed that Habré had accepted the offer in principle. The Germans also urged Touze and Puissant to keep the liberation of the hostages secret from the Tombalbaye government, which would be infuriated about the broadcast of an anti-government manifesto over German radio and a large ransom payment to the CCFAN, so the French and Germans planned to fly directly from Bardaï to Tunis before the Tombalbaye government could react.

The French began to pressure Tombalbaye to release the prisoners. Although Puissant said that the release of political prisoners was something controlled only by the Tombalbaye government, he feared that inaction on the part of Chad would stop any chance of the hostages being released. He was correct; Chad refused to release the prisoners, but seemed willing to fulfill the other two conditions that the rebels gave.

Habré demanded 1 billion CFA franc (around $2 million today) in addition to his other demands. The next day, Wallner officially accepted Habré's demands in Zouï. After two days, the negotiators again returned to Zouï to finalize negotiations, during which, according to Pierre Claustre, Puissant threatened Habré that "'terrible reprisals would fall upon the populations of Tibesti'" if any of the hostages was executed.

On 26 May 1974, Chadian soldiers began burning the homes of the gardes nomades who defected to CCFAN, and later on that evening set fire to the local palm grove.  The sub-prefect of the region told Claustre, with tears in his eyes, "'They're crazy, how could the population not hate them?'"

The French government sent in a former ambassador to Chad who had good relations with Tombalbaye to try and get a prisoner release. Tombalbaye seemed to agree, but on 2 June 1974, he gave an inflammatory speech in which he demanded that the rebels release the hostages before getting the prisoners. He threatened Habré's family, and indeed Chadian forces had captured 60 of his relatives, including his mother and son. Pierre Claustre even heard they were transported on French aircraft.

Even with these issue, Habré still released Christoph Staewen in exchange for the broadcast of the manifesto and 4 million French francs. The Germans took Staewen to Libya to avoid Chadian authorities. Later, Chad broke diplomatic relations with West Germany and declared Pierre Claustre, who had already left for France, a persona non grata. In order to resolve this, the French appointed Pierre Galopin, a French Commandant, to accompany Consul General Georges Estrade in negotiations. Pierre Galopin had previously served as deputy to Camille Gourvenec, head of Tombalbaye's intelligence service, a service that committed torture and other abuses against detainees. Galopin also led 1969 negotiations that caused large parts of FROLINAT to defect to the government, Goukouni Weddeye, the co-leader of the CCFAN, held a special grudge against Galopin,

References 

1974 in Chad
Hostage taking in Chad